Origins or origin, in comics, may refer to:

Origin story, in comic books, describing how a character gained their special abilities and/or how they became a superhero or supervillain
"Origins" (Judge Dredd story), a Judge Dredd storyline from 2000 AD
Origin (comics), a Wolverine comic book limited series published by Marvel Comics in 2002
The Origin (Buffy comic), a Dark Horse Comics mini-series retelling Buffy's origins as shown in the original film

It may also refer to:

 "Origins & Omens", a DC Comics back-up story in Green Lantern
Secret Origins, a DC Comics comic book series that told the origins of various characters
Ultimate Origins, an Ultimate Marvel limited series telling the story of the birth of the fictional universe
Wolverine: Origins, a Marvel Comics series, the sequel to Origin

See also
Origin (disambiguation)